Miss Universe China is a national beauty pageant that selects China's representative to the Miss Universe pageant since 2002.

History
The Miss Universe China Organization was established in 2002. The first ever Miss Universe China titleholder, Zhuo Ling, was selected in Guangdong province in March, 2002. She represented her country in Miss Universe 2002 and placed 2nd runner-up.

In July 2002, the Miss Universe license for China was awarded to Johnny Kao, a prominent Chinese-American entrepreneur and businessman. The organization held the Miss Universe China pageant for the next few years.

On January 6, 2011, the Miss Universe Organization designated media icon and entrepreneur Yue-Sai Kan as the official licensee for the People's Republic of China.  Miss Universe officials and the then-reigning titleholder, Ximena Navarrete of Mexico, traveled to China to award the license to Kan.  In her first year, Yue-Sai Kan set up an international calibre pageant, flying in foreign celebrities including Petra Nemcova, Fadil Berisha and Riyo Mori to headline and launching a multimillion-dollar production with major corporate sponsors. In subsequent years, the pageant has raised millions of dollars for China's national charities as well as Kan's China Beauty Charity Foundation. Celebrities including Paris Hilton and Charles Aznavour have participated in the pageant, and former Harper's Bazaar chief Lizzette Kattan provides styling for each year's candidates. Celebrity makeup artist Yuko Takahashi, ruwnay trainer Lu Sierra and DIBS Beauty CEO Jeff Lee have historically prepared the most successful winners in advance of the Miss Universe finals.
  
Under Yue-Sai Kan, the Miss Universe China Organization conducts a national search for its titleholder, consisting of a combination of regional preliminaries in major cities and provinces and direct auditions. Contestants and titleholders are trained for both the Miss China and Miss Universe competitions by an international panel of experts who prepare them in a wide range of areas, including media skills, presentation, makeup and English lessons. Winners of the Miss Universe China pageant receive one of the most valuable national crowns in the world, a diamond and ruby-encrusted tiara from Luk Fook valued at over US$430,000, as well as wardrobes supplied by Shanghai Tang, Sherri Hill, LOVA and leading Chinese couturier Guo Pei and professional modeling portfolios. They are also invited to walk for various designers at New York Fashion Week and Shanghai Fashion Week and receive red carpet invitations to the Shanghai International Film Festival and Hawaii International Film Festival. 

Nearly every contestant fielded by Kan since she began heading the pageant has brought home an award from the Miss Universe finals, including three finalists and two special awards.

In 2017 Jacky Fan, Xin Fu Lai Enterprise Management Co., LTD. took over Miss Universe China Organization. There will be 33 Regional Competitions happening across the country domestically, 1 Online Regional Competition Area, and 1 Overseas Special Audition happening in the US.

In 2022 Li Xiaoning, took over the Miss Universe China Organization as the new president along with the return of Yue-Sai Kan as official Honorary Chairman.

Documentary
In 2014, the contest was the subject of a documentary series, "Finding Miss China" (寻找中国美), produced by Jonathan Finnigan and Lucky Devil Films of Singapore.  The documentary featured three of the Miss Universe China 2014 contestants from their recruitment to their training and official visit to Colombo to meet Sri Lanka's first lady Shiranthi Rajapaksa.  The six online episodes of the documentary attracted over ten million viewers in their first month.

Titleholders

The winner of Miss Universe China represents her country at the Miss Universe. On occasion, when the winner does not qualify the contest, a runner-up is sent.

See also
Miss China World
Miss International China
Miss Earth China

References

Other references

External links
 Official Miss Universe China website

 
China
Beauty pageants in China
2002 establishments in China
Organizations established in 2002
Recurring events established in 2002
Chinese awards